San Dimas   is one of the 39 municipalities of Durango, in north-western Mexico. The municipal seat lies at Tayoltita. The municipality covers an area of 5,620.5 km².

As of 2010, the municipality had a total population of 19,691, up from 19,303 as of 2005.

The municipality has 590 localities, the largest of which (with 2010 populations in parentheses) are: Tayoltita (5,124), classified as urban, and San Miguel de Cruces (1,816), classified as rural.

References

Municipalities of Durango